CRF may refer to:

Science and technology
 Corticotropin-releasing factor family, a family of related neuropeptides in vertebrates
 Corticotropin-releasing hormone or corticotropin-releasing factor, a polypeptide hormone
 Chromatographic response function, a coefficient which characterizes the quality of the separation in the result of a chromatography
 Coefficient of rolling friction, a coefficient that measures the rolling resistance
 Cloud radiative forcing, the difference between the radiation budget components for average cloud conditions and cloud-free conditions
 Chemotactic range fitting, a phenomenon in which organisms direct their movements according to certain chemicals
 Controlled-release fertiliser, a solid form fertilizer
 Coupled rangefinder camera
 Case report form, used in clinical trial research

Computing
 Conditional random field, in machine learning, a type of graphical model
 Constant Rate Factor, used by many video encoders such as x264, x265, and VP9

Medicine
 Cardiorespiratory fitness
 Case report form, in a clinical trial, the document showing all the evaluated patient data
 Cancer-related fatigue
 Chronic renal failure, also known as chronic kidney disease (CKD)

Economics and finance
 Capital recovery factor, a financial concept
 Consolidated Revenue Fund, the main government bank account in many Commonwealth Nations

Organisations
 Catholic Reaction Force, a name used by paramilitaries to issue death threats against Protestants in Northern Ireland during "The Troubles"
 Cave Research Foundation, an American private, non-profit group dedicated to the exploration, research, and conservation of caves
 Central Readiness Force, a military defense unit in Japan
 Centro Ricerche Fiat, the central research organization for Fiat; see Blue&Me
 Air Central (ICAO airline designator), an airline in Japan

Sports
 Circle rules football, a variation on football with only one goal
 Cyprus Rugby Federation, the governing body for rugby union in Cyprus
 Clube de Regatas do Flamengo, a Brazilian football club based in Rio de Janeiro

Other uses
 Honda CRF series, a series of motorcycles
 Carolina Renaissance Festival, a festival held annually in North Carolina, US
 Charter of Rights and Freedoms, a bill of rights entrenched in the Constitution of Canada